Pseudophaloe isosoma is a moth in the family Erebidae, found in Peru. The 5.6 cm-long female of the species was described by Prout in 1920.

This moth has a black and white spotted head, and brown- or black- and white stripes along the rest of its body. The wings are also black and white, but with a red stripe on the forewing.

References

Moths described in 1920
Pseudophaloe